My Sunshine is a 2015 Chinese television series based on the novel Silent Separation written by Gu Man. It stars Wallace Chung and Tiffany Tang. The series premiered simultaneously on Dragon TV, Jiangsu TV, and iQiyi on 10 January 2015.

My Sunshine is a huge success in China with over 10 billion views online.

Synopsis 
In their university days, Zhao Mosheng fell in love at first sight with law student He Yichen. Through various incidents where Mosheng stalked Yichen on campus, Mosheng's cheerful personality charmed Yichen, and they slowly became college sweethearts. When Yichen's foster sister, Yimei challenged Mosheng for Yichen's attention, Mosheng turned directly to Yichen for clarification, but did not expect to receive a cold response from him. Mistaking that Yichen and Yimei are a couple, Mosheng followed her father's arrangements and moved to the United States to continue her studies. Seven years later, Mosheng, who is now a professional photographer, returns to China, and coincidentally bumps into Yichen who has never forgotten her after all these years. Since the seven years they broke up, many people stand in the way of these star-crossed lovers: foster-sister Yimei; Mosheng's marriage in United States; the unrelentingly infatuated ex-husband Ying Hui; as well as the financial grudges between the couple's fathers. All these situations continue to affect the two former lovers, but instead, these misunderstandings and challenges give them a better comprehension of the love they have missed over the past seven years.

Cast

Main
 Wallace Chung as He Yichen
Luo Yunxi as young He Yichen
 Tiffany Tang as Zhao Mosheng
 Janice Wu as young Zhao Mosheng
 Jian Renzi as He Yimei
 Tan Kai as Ying Hui
 Mi Lu as Xiao Xiao
 Yang Le as Lu Yuanfeng

Supporting

Law Office
 Zhao Chu Lun as Xiang Heng
 Hou Rui Xiang as young Xiang Heng
 Lin Peng as Yuan Fei
 Huang Shi Chao as Lawyer Liu
 Liu Yu Jin as Mei Ting

Treasure Magazine
 Zang Hong Na as Gu Xinghong
 Rong Rong as Editor Zhang
 Song Zi Qiao as Wen Min
 Zhang Nai Ou as Tao Yijing
 He Guo Xuan as Da Bao

Others
 Wu Ren Yuan as Zhao Qingyuan
 Qin Yue as Pei Fangmei
 Duanmu Chong Hui as Linda
 Wu Yan Su as Xu Ying
 Chen Xin Yu as young Xu Ying
 Wang Xiao Ying as Juan Jie
 Gao Ting Ting as Mi Feier
 Long Yi Yi as Tong Xinying
 Li Chen as Hairstylist

Production 
Wallace Chung and Tiffany Tang were cast in the respective lead roles of He Yichen and Zhao Mosheng six months after the show's initial production announcement at the end of 2013. Filming started on June 20, 2014 in Shanghai, and ended September 14, 2014 at Hong Kong's Victoria Harbour.

The younger versions of Mosheng and Yichen were supposed to be acted by two unknown newcomers, but after behind-the-scenes photos were leaked, netizens criticized the actors' appearances, "During the seven years, does this mean they went to South Korea for plastic surgery?" Both Tiffany Tang and Wallace Chung expressed their desire to film their own university-era character versions, so the original footage was scrapped, and university-era scenes were filmed in September 2014.

Soundtrack

Ratings 

 Highest ratings are marked in red, lowest ratings are marked in blue

Awards and nominations

International broadcast
 - 8TV (Malaysia)
 - Amarin TV
 – MyTV - 1 February 2019

References

External links 
 My Sunshine official Dragon TV website 
 My Sunshine official Croton Media website 
 My Sunshine official iQiyi website 
 

Television shows set in Hong Kong
Television shows set in Shanghai
Chinese romance television series
Television shows based on Chinese novels
Jiangsu Television original programming
Dragon Television original programming
2015 Chinese television series debuts
Television series by Croton Media